Star Vivaah is a Hindi matrimonial reality show premiered on STAR Plus at May 13, 2009. The reported purpose of this show is to help young men and women find life partners.

Plot 

A matrimonial show in India that attempts to match single people by televising the profiles submitted by the contestants. Show participants describe themselves, their home and their regular activities. Celebrity guests from television as well as Bollywood appear on the weekly show.

The Hosts 
 Mohnish Bahl
 Addite Shirwaikar

Guests 

 Juhi Parmar and Sachin Shroff
 Hussain Kuwajerwala and Tina Kuwajerwala
 Anang Desai and Chitra Desai
 Sweta Keswani and Alexx ONell

External links 
 
 On Star Plus Website

StarPlus original programming
Indian reality television series
2009 Indian television series debuts
2009 Indian television series endings